Lilia Tarawa is a New Zealand speaker, author, entrepreneur, and influencer. Tarawa grew up in the Gloriavale Christian Community on New Zealand's West Coast, but left the community with her parents and siblings in 2009. In 2017 Tarawa published her bestselling book Daughter of Gloriavale and gave the viral TEDx talk: I grew up in a cult. It was heaven – and hell.

Biography
For the first 18 years of her life, Tarawa lived in the Gloriavale Christian Community. Tarawa said she felt "brainwashed" but struggled with the restrictions placed on her.

At 16 years old, Lilia made a vow to her grandfather Neville Cooper during a commitment ceremony, promising she would submit to men, look after the home and remain "meek", "modest" and "pure". She renounced adultery, divorce, birth control, and abortion. Tarawa also vowed to marry whichever man the community's leaders chose and clean, cook, and sew for the community of around 500 people. Tarawa vowed to disown and condemn anyone who was not a believer.

Tarawa witnessed other children she was friends with being beaten for bad behaviour, because according to Tarawa, "old-fashioned corporal punishment was encouraged". Neville Cooper, the leader of Gloriavale, believed women were ready for marriage and sex when they began their menstrual cycle. Tarawa says it was only the New Zealand marriage laws which stopped marriages before the age of 16. Tarawa says Cooper "would have happily married off children of 10 or 12 years" if the law allowed it. At 18 years old, two incidents altered her perspective on Gloriavale. These included witnessing a young boy being violently punished with a leather belt. Another was her best friend being told she had to marry an Indian boy she had never met because Gloriavale planned to open a chapter in India.

Although Tarawa never witnessed sexual abuse, her parents grew uncomfortable because of arranged marriages and families being separated when some members chose to leave the Gloriavale community. Tarawa explained even when Cooper was found guilty of sexual assault, Cooper was held in high regard and gave religious instruction from prison. Tarawa said most families living in Gloriavale were unaware of their leader's sex abuse conviction and believed he was jailed for preaching the gospel.

In 2009, Tarawa and her family, including her father Perry, her pregnant mother Miracle, and her six younger siblings left Gloriavale with all their possessions in a van. They joined Tarawa's three other siblings, Sara, Sam, and Victor, who had escaped Gloriavale as teenagers. When Tarawa's siblings ran away, her parents were told they were sinners who should be dead to them. Tarawa believed for years leaving Gloriavale meant she would go to hell.

Since leaving, Tarawa has run her own small business. Tarawa has designed websites for friends and family. Tarawa also had management roles for her parents' plumbing, drainage and electrical business.

In 2017, eight years after leaving Gloriavale, Tarawa's six younger siblings still lived at home with their parents in Canterbury. Her siblings were involved in kapa haka and basketball. Tarawa planned on learning about her whakapapa. Tarawa says she was discouraged from identifying as Māori but she has since changed her views. Tarawa noted that her taua, as well as reconnecting with her grandmother and a few of her Māori family outside of Gloriavale, has allowed her to explore more of her Māori heritage. She said "I'd like to learn more about our culture in general. Like, what are we passionate about? And what iwi are out there, because I know that I'm Ngāi Tahu, but I don't know a lot about other iwi." Tarawa now speaks out about female repression within the church.

Tarawa said she heard that "everything got stricter" after her family left Gloriavale. She noted that it was uncommon "for a whole family to leave together", whereas typically the community may see "one or two people running away in the middle of the night, backpack on their shoulders."

1 News filmed a segment on Tarawa called Finding Lilia. Tarawa describes trying to reprogramme her mind after a lifetime of propaganda at Gloriavale.

In 2017, Tarawa published the autobiography Daughter of Gloriavale: My Life in a Religious Cult about her experiences in Gloriavale. This was one of New Zealand's most successful books in 2017. Daughter of Gloriavale was one of the most popular eBooks borrowed from the Christchurch City Libraries during the COVID-19 lockdown. Tarawa also spoke in 2017 at the TEDxChristchurch conference about her experiences in a talk called I grew up in a cult. It was heaven – and hell. , the video has over 11,368,472 views.

In 2019, former Gloriavale member Jeremy Max died in a motorcycle crash in Milford. Tarawa spoke about the death of her "beautiful relative".

Personal life
Tarawa lives in Christchurch, New Zealand. She is the granddaughter of the Australian-born founder of Gloriavale, Hopeful Christian (formerly known as Neville Cooper), and has 9 siblings. She is part of the Māori tribe Ngāi Tahu.

Tarawa considers herself agnostic and says she has a "science-based worldview".

Work

See also
Gloriavale Christian Community

References

External links
 

1990 births
Living people
21st-century New Zealand women
New Zealand women activists
21st-century New Zealand women writers
New Zealand motivational speakers
New Zealand bloggers
New Zealand women bloggers
People from Christchurch
New Zealand Māori women
New Zealand agnostics
New Zealand former Christians
Ngāi Tahu people